Rugby Club Kochebi Bolnisi is a Georgian semi-professional rugby union club from Bolnisi, who plays in the Georgia Championship, the first division of Georgian rugby.

Achievements 

Didi 10:
Winners (3): 1997, 1998, 2007
Runner-up (4): 1996, 1999, 2000, 2003
Third Place (4): 2002, 2006, 2008, 2010
Georgia Cup:
Winners (1): 2007

Current squad
2019/20

Current Georgia Elite Squad
  Giorgi Begadze

International honours 
  Sandro Esakia
  Giorgi Khositashvili
  Rati Urushadze
  Giorgi Tsiklauri
  Jaba Malaguradze
  Giorgi Begadze
  Temur Sokhadze

See also
 Rugby union in Georgia

Kochebi
Kvemo Kartli